Aitebaar is a Pakistani television drama series produced by Momina Duraid under banner MD Productions and first aired on Hum TV on 24 January 2022. It stars Zarnish Khan, Syed Jibran and Ali Safina in leading roles.

The series received negative comments from social media users for trivialising the victims of rape and received mixed reviews from critics.

The OST was Sung by Atif Ali and Wardah Lodhi . Music by Atif Ali .

Plot summary 
The series follows the story of a daily life challenges faced by a girl, Parisa a.k.a. Pari, who is a doctor by profession. Her life turns upside down when her husband, Hamza refuses to accept her when she escapes from a rape attempt on road. The story is full of love, emotions, and romance. The story revolves around the life of a young passionate girl and her struggles.

Cast 
 Zarnish Khan as Parisa Ahmed "Pari"
 Syed Jibran as Hamza Parias Ex Husband, Hareem father and Naveen Husband 
 Michelle Mumtaz as Shiza Ahmed
 Hamza Tariq Jamil as Bilal
 Huma Nawab as Bilal's mother
 Sajida Syed as Shagufta, Pari, Shiza's & Shehryar mother
 Rana Majid as Shehryar, Pari and Shiza's brother
 Faiza Gillani as Fariha, Pari and Shiza's sister-in-law
 Arez Ahmed as Asfand love interest of Hina
 Mehmood Aslam as Malik Jahangir
 Sabahat Adil as Asfand's mother
 Ali Safina as Babar, Pari's Ahmed boss and later husband
 Areeba Shahood Alvi as Naveen Babar sister, Parisa sister in law 
 Emaan Ahmed (Child Star) as Hareem, Pari and Hamza's daughter and Babar's stepdaughter

Production 
The series is written by Maimoona Aziz who previously wrote 2020 series Tera Ghum Aur Hum and directed by Nadeem Siddiqui who previously directed 2020 series Tarap.

References 

Pakistani drama television series
Hum TV original programming
2022 Pakistani television series debuts